St Peter & St Paul's Church, Oxton is a Grade I listed parish church in the Church of England in Oxton, Nottinghamshire.

History

The church dates from the 12th century.

The church is in a joint parish with:
Holy Cross Church, Epperstone
St Swithun's Church, Woodborough
St Laurence's Church, Gonalston

Memorials

Memorials include:
William Savile, 1681. Brass plaque, nave floor

Organ
A specification of the organ can be found on the National Pipe Organ Register.

References

Church of England church buildings in Nottinghamshire
Grade I listed churches in Nottinghamshire